Olivier Ducastel (born 23 February 1962) is a French film director, screenwriter and sound editor who currently works in collaboration with partner Jacques Martineau.

Life and career 

After spending his adolescence in Rouen, Martineau moved to Paris to study film and theatre at the University of the New Sorbonne. In 1988 he directed a short musical comedy, Le Goût de plaire. In the same year, he acted as assistant to his mentor, Jacques Demy, on the film Trois places pour le 26, the last film Demy completed before his death in 1990. Ducastel spent the early 1990s working as a sound editor on various films.

In 1995 Ducastel met Jacques Martineau, and the two began a professional and personal relationship.  Their first collaborative venture, Jeanne et le Garçon formidable, (an HIV/AIDS-themed musical comedy inspired by the films of Demy, and featuring Virginie Ledoyen and Demy's son Mathieu) was released in 1998. The film was entered into the 48th Berlin International Film Festival.

Ducastel and Martineau have since directed further films with gay-related storylines, including the ambitious, almost three-hour-long Nés en 68 starring Laetitia Casta and Yannick Renier.

Filmography

References

External links

1962 births
Living people
French film directors
French male screenwriters
LGBT film directors
Mass media people from Lyon
Sorbonne Nouvelle University Paris 3 alumni
French gay writers
Sound editors